Hush, Hush, Sweet Charlotte was an LP album by Patti Page, released by Columbia Records in 1965.

The album was reissued, combined with the 1968 Patti Page album Gentle on My Mind, in compact disc format, by Collectables Records on August 24, 1999.

Track listing

References

Patti Page albums
Columbia Records albums
1965 albums
Albums produced by Bob Johnston